KMIT (105.9 FM, "Hot Country 105.9") is a radio station licensed to serve Mitchell, South Dakota.  The station is owned by Saga Communications of South Dakota, LLC. It airs a country music format.

The station was assigned the KMIT call letters by the Federal Communications Commission.

Ownership
In April 2001, Saga Communications Inc. reached a deal to acquire KMIT and KGGK (now known as KUQL) from Mitchell Broadcasting Ltd. for a reported $4.05 million.

Honors
In February 2005, KMIT sports director Tim Smith and John Papendick of the Aberdeen American News were named sportscaster and sportswriter of the year, respectively, in South Dakota.

KMIT-HD2
KMIT airs an adult contemporary format on its HD2 subchannel, branded as "More 95.5" (simulcast on translator K238BA 95.5 FM Mitchell).

KMIT-HD3
KMIT aired a sports format with programming from ESPN Radio on its HD3 subchannel, branded as "ESPN 103.5" (simulcast on translator K278BJ 103.5 FM Mitchell. On August 20, 2018, KMIT-HD3/K278BJ changed their format from sports to oldies, branded as "Pure Oldies 103.5".

Translators
In addition to the main station, KMIT's HD2 & HD3 subchannels are relayed on the following translators:

References

External links
 KMIT official website

 
 
 
 

MIT
Country radio stations in the United States
Mitchell, South Dakota
Davison County, South Dakota
Mitchell, South Dakota micropolitan area
Mass media in the Mitchell, South Dakota micropolitan area